Ceraspis is a genus of beetles in the subfamily Melolonthinae.

Species 
 Ceraspis albipennis Frey, 1973
 Ceraspis albovaria Blanchard, 1850
 Ceraspis alvarengai Frey, 1973
 Ceraspis amazonica Frey, 1962
 Ceraspis amoena Frey, 1962
 Ceraspis bicolor Moser, 1919
 Ceraspis bivittata Burmeister, 1855
 Ceraspis bivulnerata (Germar, 1824)
 Ceraspis brittoni Frey, 1962
 Ceraspis brunneipennis (Bates, 1887)
 Ceraspis bufo Frey, 1962
 Ceraspis burmeisteri Frey, 1962
 Ceraspis castaneipennis Blanchard, 1850
 Ceraspis centralis (Sharp, 1877)
 Ceraspis cinerea Moser, 1921
 Ceraspis citrina Blanchard, 1850
 Ceraspis clypealis Frey, 1962
 Ceraspis colon Burmeister, 1855
 Ceraspis conspersa Burmeister, 1855
 Ceraspis convexicollis Frey, 1969
 Ceraspis cornuta (Blanchard, 1850)
 Ceraspis costulata Frey, 1965
 Ceraspis decora Gory, 1829
 Ceraspis diversa Frey, 1962
 Ceraspis dorsata Burmeister, 1855
 Ceraspis dorsopicta Frey, 1972
 Ceraspis elegans Nonfried, 1891
 Ceraspis elongata Frey, 1962
 Ceraspis farinosa Burmeister, 1855
 Ceraspis femorata Frey, 1969
 Ceraspis flava Blanchard, 1850
 Ceraspis fulva Blanchard, 1850
 Ceraspis gibbicollis Blanchard, 1850
 Ceraspis globicollis Frey, 1962
 Ceraspis griseosquamosa Moser, 1921
 Ceraspis guttata Blanchard, 1850
 Ceraspis hispida (Bates, 1887)
 Ceraspis imitatrix Nonfried, 1891
 Ceraspis immaculata Burmeister, 1855
 Ceraspis innotata (Blanchard, 1850)
 Ceraspis insularis (Arrow, 1903)
 Ceraspis jaliscoensis Delgado & Navarrete-Heredia, 2004
 Ceraspis klenei Brenske, 1890
 Ceraspis kuntzeni Moser, 1921
 Ceraspis lepida Frey, 1973
 Ceraspis leucosoma Blanchard, 1850
 Ceraspis lineata (Waterhouse, 1879)
 Ceraspis linharensis Frey, 1973
 Ceraspis lurida Frey, 1962
 Ceraspis macrophylla Moser, 1919
 Ceraspis martinezi Frey, 1962
 Ceraspis melanoleuca Serville, 1825
 Ceraspis mexicana (Harold, 1863)
 Ceraspis mixta Blanchard, 1850
 Ceraspis modesta Burmeister, 1855
 Ceraspis moseri Frey, 1962
 Ceraspis mustela Frey, 1962
 Ceraspis mutica Moser, 1921
 Ceraspis nitida Frey, 1962
 Ceraspis nivea Serville, 1825
 Ceraspis niveipennis Gistel, 1857
 Ceraspis oaxacaensis Delgado, 2001
 Ceraspis oblonga Moser, 1919
 Ceraspis obscura Blanchard, 1850
 Ceraspis ocellata Frey, 1962
 Ceraspis ohausi Moser, 1921
 Ceraspis opacipennis (Moser, 1919)
 Ceraspis ornata Frey, 1962
 Ceraspis pallida Blanchard, 1850
 Ceraspis pauperata Burmeister, 1855
 Ceraspis penai Frey, 1964
 Ceraspis pereirae Frey, 1962
 Ceraspis pilatei (Harold, 1863)
 Ceraspis plaumanni Frey, 1962
 Ceraspis pulchra Frey, 1962
 Ceraspis quadrifoliata Moser, 1919
 Ceraspis quadrimaculata (Blanchard, 1850)
 Ceraspis quadripustulata (Blanchard, 1850)
 Ceraspis rotundicollis Frey, 1973
 Ceraspis rubiginosa (Latreille, 1812)
 Ceraspis ruehli Brenske, 1890
 Ceraspis ruficollis Frey, 1962
 Ceraspis rufoscutellata Moser, 1919
 Ceraspis setiventris Moser, 1921
 Ceraspis signata Blanchard, 1850
 Ceraspis sparsesetosa Frey, 1972
 Ceraspis squamulata Moser, 1924
 Ceraspis squamulifera (Moser, 1919)
 Ceraspis striata Frey, 1973
 Ceraspis subvittata Moser, 1921
 Ceraspis sulcicollis Moser, 1921
 Ceraspis tenuisquamosa Frey, 1962
 Ceraspis tibialis Blanchard, 1850
 Ceraspis unguicularis Moser, 1919
 Ceraspis variegata (Perty, 1833)
 Ceraspis ventralis Frey, 1962
 Ceraspis vestita Blanchard, 1850
 Ceraspis vittata Moser, 1919
 Ceraspis vulpes Frey, 1962
 Ceraspis zikani Moser, 1924

See also 
 Ceraspis Schultze 1887 is also an extinct (and preoccupied) name for a genus of placoderm.

References 

 Mora-Aguilar, E.F.; Delgado, L.; Vallejo, F. 2013: A new species of Ceraspis (Coleoptera: Scarabaeidae: Melolonthinae), with a key to the Colombian species of the genus. Annals of the Entomological Society of America, 106(4), pages 424–428,

External links 
 
 
 

Melolonthinae
Scarabaeidae genera
Taxa named by Amédée Louis Michel le Peletier
Taxa named by Jean Guillaume Audinet-Serville